Daniel Price White (November 16, 1814 – April 12, 1890) was a prominent Confederate politician.

Early life 
He was born in Green County, Kentucky, to his mother Judith Taylor and father Major General William Price White. He was educated at Centre College and medicine at Lexington Kentucky and Cincinnati Ohio. Afterwards he practiced medicine in Green County. He married Nancy Ferris Clark in 1837. He had 4 children: Irene Elizabeth White was born in 1842, Daniel A. "Bud" White was born in 1843, Dr. William Price White was born in 1844 and James Clarke White was born in 1847 and died in the following year of 1848.

Political life 
He joined the Kentucky legislature before becoming Speakers of the Kentucky House of Representatives in 1857–1859. He joined the Democratic National Committee in 1860. He joined the Confederate States of America in 1861. Represented the state in the Provisional Confederate Congress from 1861 to 1862.

Later life 
After the collapse of the CSA he worked at White, Brown and White Green River Tobacco Warehouse.

He died on April 12, 1890.

References

1814 births
1890 deaths
Deputies and delegates to the Provisional Congress of the Confederate States
19th-century American politicians
People from Green County, Kentucky